Kjell-Børge Freiberg (born 27 April 1971) is a Norwegian politician for the Conservative Party, formerly for the Progress Party who served as Minister of Petroleum and Energy from 2018 to 2019. He was also an MP for Nordland from 2017 to 2021 and mayor of Hadsel from 2007 to 2015.

Career
Freiberg served as the mayor of Hadsel from 2007 to 2015. Shortly after the end of his term as mayor, he was appointed as a State Secretary in the Ministry of Petroleum and Energy. He held the position from October 2015 to June 2017, when he was replaced in a state Secretary reshuffle. 

Following the 2017 election, he was elected as a representative to the Storting from Nordland.

Freiberg sought re-election for the 2021 election, but lost the nomination to Dagfinn Olsen in February 2021.

On 25 November 2021, Freiberg was excluded from his party after having allegedly leaked an internal document to Dagens Næringsliv. The document is said to have contained information of an investigation into Nordland Progress Party leader Dagfinn Olsen for having allegedly breached party guidelines. Freiberg didn't protest the exclusion and thanked for the journey he had in the party.

In January 2023, he joined the Conservative Party and stood to become the Hadsel Conservatives' mayoral candidate in the 2023 local elections.

Minister of Petroleum and Energy
Freiberg was appointed minister of petroleum and energy on 31 August 2018 following a minor reshuffle after Terje Søviknes and Ketil Solvik-Olsen resigned.

In September 2018, after nearly a month in office, Freiberg wrote a debate post in iTromsø, where he expressed that he wanted the country to think long term when it came to the petroleum industry. He also stressed that the government would follow the Paris agreement closely and strengthen the competitive industry.

References

1971 births
Living people
People from Hadsel
Progress Party (Norway) politicians
Norwegian state secretaries
Members of the Storting
Mayors of places in Nordland
Petroleum and energy ministers of Norway